Alex Malley, is the former chief executive of CPA Australia. He was removed by the CPA board of directors in late June 2017 after months of controversy regarding his excessive salary and the use of CPA funds for self-promotion of his book and TV program.

Career 
Malley began his career working at the Commonwealth Bank of Australia. He quit the job and began working at the University of Western Sydney. He began as an accounting academic at Macquarie University in 1993 and his employment was terminated for allegedly giving extra grading points for students signing up for his wife's training courses. In 2007 he was elected president of the professional accounting body in 2007. Within a year, he stepped down as President and became the CEO of the organisation in 2008.

CPA Australia
As CEO of CPA Australia, Malley came under significant criticism in the media and from CPA members in 2017 for his A$1.8 million annual salary and for the significant amounts of CPA funds going towards promoting Malley and his personal interests, such as a paid television show and Malley's autobiography. The scandal surrounding Malley, combined with broader member discontent over executive changes that made the board unaccountable and debts accrued from the establishment of a financial planning arm, led to the resignation of the CPA president and two board members by June 2017. The two resigning board members, Richard Alston and Kerry Ryan, cited the presence of "board allies of chief executive Alex Malley" refusing to "allow a wide-ranging review of Mr Malley and the organisation" as their main reason.

On 15 June, a further three directors resigned due to the expanding scandal surrounding Malley and the remaining board initiated an "independent review" of all claims made against CPA and its CEO, to be chaired by former chief of the Australian Defence Force, Sir Angus Houston. However, even the decision to create the review came under criticism when it was revealed that Houston had appeared as guest on Malley's TV program and had written a glowing foreword in Malley's book. Houston later resigned his post in favour of former Commonwealth Auditor-General, Ian McPhee.

Facing a significant swelling of discontent amongst CPA members, on 23 June 2017 it was announced that the CPA board had terminated the contract of Malley, resulting in CPA paying out the remainder of his contract to the sum of A$4.9 million. The subsequent review report released in September 2017 found that the "chief executive was overpaid, [CPA Australia] had lost touch with its members and provided questionable value for money for the services it rendered." In addition to CPA's "over-emphasis on marketing and brand building activities that centred on the former CEO", the review in particular noted the excessive CEO's salary, with its many increases over several years not being justified by organisational growth.

In January 2019 Malley and three previous directors were stripped by the CPA of their Life Memberships.

References

Published works

Australian accountants
Australian television presenters
Australian people of Greek descent
Australian people of Maltese descent
Living people
Year of birth missing (living people)
Place of birth missing (living people)
Academic staff of Macquarie University
Australian chief executives
Australian corporate directors
People educated at Trinity Grammar School (New South Wales)
University of New South Wales alumni